Gassendi may refer to:

People 
 Pierre Gassendi (1592–1655), French philosopher, scientist and mathematician
 Jean Jacques Basilien Gassendi (1748–1828), French Army general and politician
 Jean Gaspard Gassend or Gassendi (1749–1806), French priest and politician

Other 
 Gassendi (crater), a large crater on the Moon named after Pierre Gassendi